Several units of the Royal Canadian Navy have been named HMCS Stormont.

 , a  renamed Matane before commissioning. The ship served in the Battle of the Atlantic during the Second World War.
 , a River-class frigate that served in the Battle of the Atlantic during the Second World War.

Battle honours
 Atlantic, 1944–45
 Arctic, 1944
 English Channel, 1944
 Normandy, 1944

References

 Government of Canada Ship's Histories - HMCS Stormont

Royal Canadian Navy ship names